Ogyges championi is a beetle of the Family Passalidae known from the cloud forests of the mountains of Sierra de las Minas and Sierra de los Cuchumatanes in  Guatemala.

Passalidae